Nerea Gantxegi Moso (born 7 September 1994) is a Spanish footballer who plays as a defender for Levante Las Planas.

Club career
Gantxegi started her career at Urki.

References

External links
Profile at La Liga

1994 births
Living people
Women's association football defenders
Spanish women's footballers
People from Mondragón
Sportspeople from Gipuzkoa
Footballers from the Basque Country (autonomous community)
SD Eibar Femenino players
Añorga KKE players
Primera División (women) players